R. Prasanna (better known as Guitar Prasanna), is a pioneer in performing Carnatic music on the guitar. He also plays jazz, progressive rock, and world fusion.

Early life and background 
Prasanna grew up in Chennai, India and fell in love with the guitar at age of five after hearing his neighbor play. He received his first guitar when he was ten years old and would try to play Tamil and Hindi film songs and imitate the sounds of his sister's Carnatic singing with the instrument. Prasanna's interest in Western pop music developed when his father's colleague gave him some cassette tapes with songs by the Bee Gees, ABBA, Toto, Peaches and Herb, and the Pointer Sisters.

While still in high school he began making a reputation as a guitarist with local band XIth Commandment. During his years studying naval architecture at Indian institute of Technology, Madras (where he also met his wife Shalini), he toured India with his rock bands (The Haze and then Shakuni & the Birds of Prey), covering songs by Santana, Led Zeppelin, Deep Purple, Rush, Steely Dan, Jethro Tull, and the Scorpions and compositions like "Peaceful" and "Blues for Saraswati". Prasanna's musical development led him to blues and jazz. After working as a  software consultant, he gave up a career in engineering and IT and moved to Boston to attend Berklee College of Music where he majored in Jazz and Classical Composition.

Education
Prasanna received a Bachelor's degree in Naval Architecture from the Indian Institute of Technology, Madras in 1992. He also graduated magna cum laude from the Berklee College of Music, Boston.

Educator
 Established Swarnabhoomi Academy of Music and served as it president
 Faculty member at Banff Centre for Arts and Creativity, Canada for international workshop in Jazz and Creative Music in May 2008 
 Lectures and clinics at Harvard University, Institute of Music at Osnabrück University, Berklee College of Music, MIT, Tufts University, New School in New York, University of Arizona, Utah State University

Discography

As leader
 Guitar Goes Classical (Audio Fine, 1993) (India)
 Evergreen Melodies on Guitar (Keerthana, 1993) (India)
 Evergreen Classicals on Guitar (Keerthana, 1993) (India)
 Vibrant Aesthetics (Inreco, 1993) (India)
 Spirit of Youth (Saragam, 1993) (India)
 Guitar Indian Style (Oriental, 1996) (U.S.)
 Roots (Sangeetha/HMV, 1997) (India)
 Echo (Saican, 2000) (Canada)
 Apoorva Ragas on Guitar (Kalakendra, 2000) (U.S.)
 Natabhairavi (Inreco, 2000) (India)
 Shakthi: The Omnipotent (Music Today, 2000) (India)
 Peaceful (Susila, 2001)
 Ragamorphism – Guitar instructional DVD (Susila, 2004)
 Be the Change (Susila, 2004)
 Ra Rama (Kosmic, 2005) (India)
 Electric Ganesha Land (Susila, 2006)
 Live in Sedona DVD (Susila, 2009)
 Ragabop Trio (Abstract Logix, 2010) with Steve Smith, George Brooks
 Tirtha (ACT, 2011) with Vijay Iyer, Nitin Mitta
 All Terrain Guitar (Susila, 2016)
 "Apna Ek Kal" feat. Anuradha Palakurthi and Hariharan (2016) (single)

Special projects
 Summa cum Jazz (BMG, 1999)
 Lagaan (Sony, 2001) with A.R. Rahman
 Moon Guitars (De Werf, 2002) – Fabrizio Cassol, Prasanna, David Gilmore
 Million Dollar Arm (Walt Disney, 2014)
 The Hundred Foot Journey (Hollywood, 2014)

As guest
 Play by Ear – Deep C, 2002
 Peace in Progress – Manisha Shahane, 2003
 Apfelschaun – Ben Schwendener/Uwe Steinmetz (Gravity Arts, 2003)
 Moving – Tony Grey, 2004
 The Music Messiah – Illayaraja (Agi Music, 2006)
 Hidden Mandala – Marc Rossi (Gravity Records, 2008)
 Inner Duality – David Hines (Spice Rack Records, 2009)
 Mantra Revealed – Marc Rossi (Innova, 2012)

Soundtracks 
 Kochadaiyan (Tamil) – A.R. Rahman, 2014
 Highway (Bollywood) – A.R.Rahman, 2014
 Essaye Moi (French) – Pierre Van Dormael, 2006
 Mumbai Express (Tamil) – Illayaraja, 2005
 Ghajini background score (Tamil) – Harris Jayaraj, 2005
 Swades (Bollywood) – A.R.Rahman, 2004
 Dil ne Jisa apna kaha (Bollywood) – A.R.Rahman, 2004
 Udhaya (Tamil) – A.R.Rahman, 2003
 Ramanaa (Tamil) – Illayaraja, 2002
 Nee Romba Azhaga Irukke (Tamil) – Aravind/Jaishankar, 2002
 Lagaan film (Bollywood) – A.R.Rahman, 2001
 Grahan film background score (Bollywood) – Karthik Raja, 2001
 Dumm Dumm Dumm (Tamil) – Karthik Raja, 2001
 Vanchinathan (Tamil) – Karthik Raja, 2001
 Pukar (Bollywood) – A.R.Rahman, 2000
 Split Wide Open (English) – Karthik Raja, 1999
 Harischandra (Tamil) – Agosh, 1999
 Enn Swasa Kaatre (Tamil) – A.R.Rahman, 1998
 Jeans (Tamil) – A.R.Rahman, 1998
 Kizhakkum Merkkum (Tamil) – Illayaraja, 1998
 Zor (Bollywood) – Agosh, 1998
 Nam iruvar namakku iruvar (Tamil) – Karthik Raja, 1998
 Kadhala Kadhala (Tamil) – Karthik Raja, 1998
 Ullasam (Tamil) – Karthik Raja, 1996
 Lovebirds (Tamil) – A.R.Rahman, 1996
 Muthu (Tamil) – A.R.Rahman, 1995
 Puthiya Mugam (Tamil) – A.R.Rahman, 1992

Composer

Film
 Framed (2007)
 Smile Pinki (2009)
 The Open Frame (2011)
 Vazhakku Enn 18/9 (2012)
 Algorithms (2012)
 After My Garden Grows (2014)

Dance Theater
 Soliloquy (1997)
 Sanaatana (2001)
 DNA in Dance (2004)
 The Tempest (2004)
 A Story and a Song (2007)

References 
 Kopman, Budd. Prasanna Biography. All About Jazz.
 Kopman, Budd  "Tirtha at The Jazz Standard". All About Jazz. 
 Prasanna leaves Musical Borders Behind on 'All Terrain Guitar', an article in Guitar Player magazine
 Prasanna: All Terrain Guitar, an article in Vintage Guitar magazine
 Prasanna's history of the Carnatic guitar

External links
 Official site

Indian jazz guitarists
Carnatic instrumentalists
Berklee College of Music alumni
Living people
Indian film score composers
Carnatic musicians
1970 births
IIT Madras alumni
21st-century guitarists